Dendropsophus anataliasiasi is a species of frog in the family Hylidae.
It is endemic to Brazil.
Its natural habitats are moist savanna, subtropical or tropical moist shrubland, freshwater marshes, pastureland, rural gardens, and ponds.
It is threatened by habitat loss.

References

anataliasiasi
Endemic fauna of Brazil
Amphibians described in 1972
Taxonomy articles created by Polbot